Uncle Bill Reads the Funnies was a local Sunday morning children's television show on KAKE-TV in Wichita, Kansas, United States.  The show was hosted by Bill Boyle, who would read the color comics section of the Sunday Hutchinson News.

Alongside Uncle Bill was Woody, a ventriloquist figure who would help Uncle Bill lead into the comic strip to be read from the paper.  Next to Woody was Zippy, a fuzzy nondescript animal hand puppet who didn't speak, but would duck under the kitchen table to bring up a variety of props, and engage in zany antics related to the strip that Uncle Bill and Woody were about to read or had just read. Uncle Bill and Woody would deliver a light-hearted lesson about life to the viewers after the reading of each comic strip.

The show was set in the KAKE-TV's "kitchen" studio set.  The earlier Turnaround show had a different type of set.

Boyle was a minister at the Hillside Christian Church (Disciples of Christ) and the Mount Olive Christian Church (Disciples of Christ) in Wichita, Kansas during this time.

Uncle Bill also did biblical outreach in community churches during personal appearances by having the young children sit in front of a blank paper drawing board.  He would then tell a story and illustrate it, often asking the children to name characters or suggest what might happen next.  At the conclusion of the story, he would ask a volunteer to draw four random lines on the board.  He would then make a picture out of the four lines and connect it to the story.  He always finished by labeling the new picture with the chapter and verse used to create the image and give the final result to the child volunteer.

Uncle Bill had two other programs over the seventeen years he was on television.  The first was a fifteen-minute show called Doodle Time.  This program also featured Woody and Zippy and an original story told and illustrated by Uncle Bill.  The second program was a half-hour show called Turnaround. This program expanded the use of puppets and used two of his children, Brenda and Billy, in setting the stage for an original story told and illustrated by Uncle Bill. 87 of these programs have been saved and are available on DVDs at www.billandwoody.com.

Bill Boyle died on November 21, 2014.

References

Local children's television programming in the United States
American television shows featuring puppetry